Scindapsus is a genus of flowering plants in the family Araceae. It is native to Southeast Asia, New Guinea, Queensland, and a few western Pacific islands.  The species Scindapsus pictus is common in cultivation.

Scindapsus is not easily distinguishable from Epipremnum. The main difference between the two genera is in the number of seeds they produce. Scindapsus species have one ovule in each ovary whereas Epipremnum species have a few. The seeds of Scindapsus are rounded to slightly kidney-shaped. The plants are primarily root climbing vines.

History of the name
Claudius Aelianus (Aelian, 2-3 cc., De Natura Animalium XII.44-46, XVII.18), uses the word in relation to an Indian musical instrument used for taming the wild elephants.

Species
Scindapsus alpinus Alderw. - Sumatra
Scindapsus altissimus Alderw. - Queensland, New Guinea, Solomon Islands
Scindapsus beccarii Engl. - Sumatra, Borneo, Peninsular Malaysia
Scindapsus carolinensis Hosok. - Chuuk Islands in Micronesia
Scindapsus coriaceus Engl. - Borneo
Scindapsus crassipes Engl. - Borneo
Scindapsus curranii Engl. & K.Krause - Sabah, Philippines
Scindapsus cuscuaria (Aubl.) C.Presl - Nicobar Islands, Philippines, Maluku, Java
Scindapsus cuscuarioides Engl. & K.Krause - New Guinea
Scindapsus falcifolius Engl. - Sulawesi
Scindapsus geniculatus Engl. - Sarawak
Scindapsus glaucescens (Engl. & K.Krause) Alderw. - Borneo
Scindapsus grandifolius Engl. - described 1898 from material cultivated at botanical garden in Bogor; probably now extinct
Scindapsus hederaceus Miq. - Indochina, Borneo, Java, Sumatra, Philippines 
Scindapsus javanicus Alderw. - Java
Scindapsus latifolius M.Hotta - Borneo
Scindapsus longipes Engl. - Brunei, Sarawak
Scindapsus longistipitatus Merr. - Borneo
Scindapsus lucens Bogner & P.C.Boyce - Sumatra, Peninsular Malaysia
Scindapsus maclurei (Merr.) Merr. & F.P.Metcalf - Hainan, Vietnam, Laos, Thailand
Scindapsus mamilliferus Alderw. - Borneo
Scindapsus marantifolius Miq. - Java
Scindapsus officinalis (Roxb.) Schott - India, Bangladesh, Bhutan, Assam, Nepal, Andaman Islands, Myanmar, Thailand, Laos, Cambodia, Vietnam 
Scindapsus perakensis Hook.f. - Bangladesh, Thailand, Peninsular Malaysia, Borneo, Java, Sumatra 
Scindapsus pictus Hassk. - Bangladesh, Thailand, Peninsular Malaysia, Borneo, Java, Sumatra, Sulawesi, Philippines
Scindapsus roseus Alderw. - Sumatra
Scindapsus rupestris Ridl. - Thailand, Peninsular Malaysia, Borneo, Sumatra
Scindapsus salomoniensis Engl. & K.Krause - Solomon Islands
Scindapsus schlechteri K.Krause - Papua New Guinea
Scindapsus scortechinii Hook.f. - Bangladesh, Thailand, Peninsular Malaysia
Scindapsus splendidus Alderw. - Sumatra
Scindapsus subcordatus Engl. & K.Krause - Papua New Guinea
Scindapsus suffruticosus Alderw. - Sumatra
Scindapsus sumatranus (Schott) P.C.Boyce & A.Hay - Sumatra
Scindapsus treubii Engl. - Peninsular Malaysia, Borneo, Java

Formerly classified 
Scindapsus aureus - Now classified as Epipremnum aureum

References

Monsteroideae
Araceae genera